Los Cipreses  is a village in the municipality of Trevelin Chubut Province in southern Argentina near the border with Chile.

References

Populated places in Chubut Province
Argentina–Chile border crossings